Cheene Badam is a 2022 Indian Bengali language film directed by Shieladitya Moulik. The film is produced by Ena Saha and Banani Saha under the banner of Jarek Entertainment. This film features Yash Dasgupta and Ena Saha in lead roles.

Plot 

Rishav is a techie, creates a mobile app Cheene Baadaam that helps lonely people find friends. His girlfriend Trisha helped him build the app but now they are estranged. Life takes a weird turn when they now use their app to find friends.

Cast 

 Yash Dasgupta as Rishav  
 Ena Saha as Trisha

Soundtrack 

All the songs are composed by Soumya Rit and Rupak Tiary. The lyrics are penned by Soumya Rit and Avima Paul.

Controversy 
Few days before release, Yash Dasgupta posted in Twitter account that he would no more be associated with the film due to creative differences with the director Shieladitya Moulik and producer Ena Saha. Later, the producer and director informed that they weren't previously informed about Yash's isolation with the film. Later, the director informed that Yash had an issue with a dark-skinned guy who danced in the title track, which Yash denied.

Release 
The film released theatrically on 10 June 2022.

Reception

References

External links 

 

Bengali-language Indian films
2020s Bengali-language films